Likonde is a small village in  the Ruvuma Region of southwestern Tanzania. It is located along the A19 road, to the northeast of Kigonsera.

References

Populated places in Ruvuma Region